Manu Attri (born 31 December 1992) is an Indian badminton player who currently plays men's and mixed doubles. He partners with Jishnu Sanyal for men's doubles events and previously partnered with B. Sumeeth Reddy. For mixed doubles events, he partners with N. Siki Reddy, and previously, K. Maneesha. He competed at the 2014 Asian Games, and at the 2016 Summer Olympics.

Career

2010

BWF World Junior Championships 2010 
Manu was a part of the Indian team that participated in the BWF World Junior Championship in 2010. India was placed in Group Z2 along with Denmark and the USA. India finished 9th in this tournament.

BWF Bimantara Cups World Junior Championships 
Men's Doubles

with Prannoy H. S. (IND)

Round 1: vs Morten BRøDBæK & Nikolaj OVERGAARD (DEN) 19-21 12-21 Lost

Mixed Doubles

with Gauri Ghate (IND)

Round 1: Bye

Round 2: Seung Il CHOI & So Young PARK (KOR) 20-22 19-21 Lost

Maldives International Challenge 2010 
Men's Doubles

with Sanyal Jisnu (IND)

Round 1: Khanjani Mohammad Reza & Eskandari Vatannejad Soroush (IRI) 21-10 21-11 Win

Round 2: Fernando Eranga & Matarage Indika (SRI) 21-3 21-9 Win

Quarterfinals: Karunaratne Dinuka & Karunaratne Niluka (SRI)[4] 7-21 10-21 Lost

India Grand Prix Gold 
Men's Doubles

with Sanyal Jisnu (IND)

Round 1: vs Marwan Saada Yasin & Marwan Saada Youssef (EGY) 21-2 21-12 Win

Round 2: vs Rizki Delynugraha Mochamad & Rijal Muhammad (INA) 18-21 7-21 Lost

2011

Badminton Asia Championships 2011 
Men's Doubles

with Sanyal Jisnu (IND)

Qualification 3 Semifinal: vs Quang Tuan Bui & Ha Anh Le (VIE) 21-15 21-9 Win

Qualification 3 Final: Prom Saravuth & Yongvannak Teav (CAM) 21-13 21-18 Win

Round 1: Bang Duc Bui & Manh Thang Dao (VIE) 23-25 21-14 14-21 Lost

Yonex-Sunrise India Open 
Men's Doubles

with Sanyal Jisnu (IND)

Round 1: Bye

Round 2: Kien Keat Koo & Boon Heong Tan [1](MAS) 9-21 14-21 Lost

Maldives International Badminton Challenge 2011 
Men's Double

with Sanyal Jisnu (IND)

Round 1: Moosa Ahmed & Shafeeg Ibrahim (MDV) 21-6 21-8 Win

Round 2: Thasleem Ibrahim & Zuhury Ismail (MDV) 21-3 21-12 Win

Quarterfinal: Koch Jurgen & Zauner Peter (AUT) 19-21 18-21 Lost

Mauritius International 2011 
Men's Doubles

with Sanyal Jisnu (IND) seeded 2nd

Round 1: Bye

Round 2: Deeneshsing Baboolall & Yoni Louison (MRI) 21-14 21-15 Win

Quarterfinal: Aatish Lubah & Julien Paul (MRI) 21-12 21-9 Win

Semifinal: Giovanni Greco & Rosario Maddaloni [4] (ITA) 21-10 21-14 Win

Final: Dorian James & Willem Viljoen [1] (SA) 21-19 21-9 Win

Kenya International Series 2011 
with Sanyal Jisnu (IND) seeded 4th

Men's Doubles

Round 1: Bye

Round 2: Adamu Ibrahim & Elewa Olorunfemi (NIG) 21-13 21-11 Win

Quarterfinal: Emre Lale & Murat Sen (TUR) 21-11 21-10 Win

Semifinal: Jinkam Ifraimu Bulus & Ebenezer Olaluwa Fagbemi [2](NIG) 21-8 21-19 Win

Final: Dorian James & Willem Viljoen [1] (SA) 21-13 21-12 Win

Yonex Sunrise Vietnam Grand Prix Open 2011 
Men's Doubles

with Sanyal Jisnu (IND)

Round 1: Shen Low Juan & Jagdish Singh (MAS) 7-21 21-17 17-21 Lost

Yonex Chinese Taipei Open 2011 
Men's Doubles

with Sanyal Jisnu (IND)

Round 1: Alvent Yulianto Chandra & Hendra Aprida Gunawan [4](INA) 16-21 12-21 Lost

Li Ning China Masters 
Men's Doubles

with Sanyal Jisnu (IND)

Round 1: Walkover

Yonex Open Japan 
Men's Doubles

with Sanyal Jisnu (IND)

Round 1: Walkover

Yonex Dutch Open 2011 
Men's Doubles

with Sanyal Jisnu (IND)

Round 1: Walkover

Bangladesh International Series 2011 
Men's Doubles

with T. Hemanagendra Babu (IND)

Round 1: Bye

Round 2: Walkover

Mixed Doubles

with N. Sikki Reddy(IND)

Round 1: Walkover

Tata Open India International Challenge 2011 
Men's Doubles

with T. Hemanagendra Babu (IND)

Round 1: Bang Duc Bui & Manh Thang Dao (VIE) 19-21 21-12 16-21 Lost

Mixed Doubles

with N. Sikki Reddy(IND)

Round 1: Arun Vishnu & Aparna Balan [3] (IND) 15-21 10-21 Lost

Yonex - Sunrise Syed Modi Memorial India Open Grand Prix Gold 
Men's Doubles

with T. Hemanagendra Babu (IND)

Round 1: Peng Soon Chan & Aik Quan Tan 15-21 19-21 Lost

Mixed Doubles

with N. Sikki Reddy(IND)

Round 1: Ha Anh Le & Thu Huyen Le (VIE) 21-14 21-10 Win

Round 2: V. Diju & Jwala Gutta [3] (IND) 14-21 11-21 Lost

2012

Iran Fajr International Challenge 2012 
He partnered with T. Hemanagendra Babu (IND) for the Men's doubles event. In round 1 they defeated the Iranian players Alireza Faghfouri & Mehran Shahbazi by 21-9 22-20. In round 2, the pair was defeated by Itani Kazuya & Tomoya Takashina from Japan with a score of 21-18 14-21 16-21.

Austrian International Challenge 2012 
Manu partnered with T. Hemanagendra Babu (IND) for the Men's doubles event. They defeated the German pair of Mark Flato & Patrick Kaemnitz in round 1 by 21-10 21-11. In round 2 they lost against 2nd seed host favourite Jurgen Koch & Peter Zauner by 14-21 10-21.

Yonex Sunrise India Open 2012 
He again went back to his partnership with Sanyal Jisnu for the Men's doubles event. The pair lost their 1st match against the Indonesian pair of Adam Cwalina & Michael Logosz by 13-21 17-21. For the mixed doubles, he paired up with N. Sikki Reddy. They were seeded 2nd in the tournament, but got knocked out by Danny Bawa Chrisnanta & Yu Yan Vanessa Neo from Singapore by 11-21 21-17 15-21 in round 1.

Russia Open Grand Prix 2012 
He partnered with Sanyal Jisnu for the Men's doubles event; the pair gave walkover to local pair of Yaroslav Egerev & Andrey Parokhodin in round 1.

White Nights 2012 
He partnered with Sanyal Jisnu for the Men's doubles event; the pair gave walkover in round 1.

Li Ning China Open 2012 
He started his new partnership with B. Sumeeth Reddy and entered in the qualification round for the Men's Doubles event. In round 1 of qualification, the pair got a bye, while in round 2 the Chinese pair of Guo Zhendong & Xu Chen gave them a walkover. The team qualified for the main draw, but eventually lost to Alvent Yulianto Chandra and Markis Kido from Indonesia by 17-21, 21-13, 11-21 in the 1st round.

Yonex Sunrise Hong Kong Open 2012 
He partnered with B. Sumeeth Reddy and entered in the qualification round of the men's doubles event. In Qualification Round 1, the pair defeated Lai Chein Cheng of Taipei and Joe Wu of New Zealand by 21-11 and 21-14. In Qualification Round 2, they knocked out 3rd seed Lee Chun Hei and Ng Ka Long from Hong Kong by 21-13, 13-21, 21-15 and qualified for the main draw.

In Round 1, the pair lost to Alvent Yulianto Chandra and Markis Kido from Indonesia by 21-11, 11-21, 15-21.

Kumpoo Macau Open Badminton Grand Prix Gold 2012 
He partnered with B. Sumeeth Reddy and entered in the qualification round of the men's doubles event. They lost to the top seed Taipei pair of Lu Ching Yao & Tseng Min Hao by 19-21 22-20 9-21 in the 1st round of qualification.

TATA Open India International Challenge 2012 
He partnered with B. Sumeeth Reddy and entered in the qualification round of Men's Doubles event as 4th seed. For Mixed Doubles, he partnered with K. Maneesha and entered into the main round.

In Qualification Round 1, Sumeeth and Manu defeated Chun Chun Hung and Sheng-Jie Yang from Taipei by 21-13 and 21-11. In Round 2, they played against Taipei pair of Tien Tzu Chieh and Yang Po Han  by 21-16, 9-21, 21-19, qualifying them for the main round. They played against Indian pair of S. Sanjeeth and Jagadish Yadav and got past them with a 21-13, 21-13 victory. In Round 2, they faced the top-seeded Koran pair of Ko Sung Hyun and Lee Yong Dae and lost the match by 17-21, 9-21.

In Mixed Doubles Round 1, he along with Manisha faced 2nd seed Zhao Jiang, Terry Yeo and Dellis Yuliana from Indonesia and lost against them by 16-21 and 13-21.

Shaheed Dr. K.L. Garg - Syed Modi International India GPG 2012 
He partnered with B. Sumeeth Reddy and K. Maneesha respectively for Men's and Mixed Doubles events and received entries for the main round.

In Men's Doubles Round 1, they defeat French pair Ronan Laber and Mathias Quere by 21-15, 12-21, 21-15. In Round 2, they lost to 5th seed Gideon Markus Fernaldi and Agripinna Prima Rahmanto Putra from Indonesia by 19-21 and 11-21.

In Mixed Doubles, Manu-Maneesha lost against Zhao Jiang, Terry Yeo and Dellis Yuliana from Indonesia by 8-21 and 20-22.

2014

2015 
He won the Mexico City Grand Prix. He was runner up of Dutch open and US open grand prix gold. He won the Lagos International.

Achievements

South Asian Games 
Men's doubles

Mixed doubles

BWF Grand Prix (2 titles, 3 runners-up) 
The BWF Grand Prix had two levels, the Grand Prix and Grand Prix Gold. It was a series of badminton tournaments sanctioned by the Badminton World Federation (BWF) and played between 2007 and 2017.

Men's doubles

Mixed doubles

 BWF Grand Prix Gold tournament
 BWF Grand Prix tournament

BWF International Challenge/Series (12 titles, 5 runners-up) 
Men's doubles

Mixed doubles

  BWF International Challenge tournament
  BWF International Series tournament
  BWF Future Series tournament

References

Living people
1992 births
Sportspeople from Meerut
Indian male badminton players
Indian national badminton champions
Badminton players at the 2016 Summer Olympics
Olympic badminton players of India
Badminton players at the 2014 Asian Games
Badminton players at the 2018 Asian Games
Asian Games competitors for India
South Asian Games gold medalists for India
South Asian Games silver medalists for India
South Asian Games medalists in badminton